Henry Norris Russell ForMemRS HFRSE FRAS (October 25, 1877 – February 18, 1957) was an American astronomer who, along with Ejnar Hertzsprung, developed the Hertzsprung–Russell diagram (1910). He is often given credit for discovering the chemical composition of the Sun, though this was in fact the work of Cecilia Payne, whose work he had earlier prevented from publishing due to it being at odds with the composition of the Earth. In 1923, working with Frederick Saunders, he developed Russell–Saunders coupling, which is also known as LS coupling.

Life
Russell was born on 25 October 1877, at Oyster Bay, New York, the son of Rev Alexander Gatherer Russell (1845-1911) and his wife, Eliza Hoxie Norris.

After graduating from George School in 1895, he studied astronomy at Princeton University, obtaining his B.A. In 1897 and his doctorate in 1899, studying under Charles Augustus Young. From 1903 to 1905, he worked at the Cambridge Observatory with Arthur Robert Hinks as a research assistant of the Carnegie Institution and came under the strong influence of George Darwin.

He returned to Princeton to become an instructor in astronomy (1905–1908), assistant professor (1908–1911), professor (1911–1927) and research professor (1927–1947). He was also the director of the Princeton University Observatory from 1912 to 1947 where Charlotte Moore Sitterly helped him measure and calculate the properties of stars.

He died in Princeton, New Jersey on 18 February 1957 at the age of 79. He is buried in Princeton Cemetery.

Family

In November 1908 Russell married Lucy May Cole (1881-1968). They had four children. Their youngest daughter, Margaret Russell (1914-1999), married the astronomer Frank K. Edmondson in the 1930s.

Published work
Russell co-wrote an influential two-volume textbook in 1927 with Raymond Smith Dugan and John Quincy Stewart: Astronomy: A Revision of Young’s Manual of Astronomy (Ginn & Co., Boston, 1926–27, 1938, 1945). This became the standard astronomy textbook for about two decades. There were two volumes: the first was The Solar System and the second was Astrophysics and Stellar Astronomy. The textbook popularized the idea that a star's properties (radius, surface temperature, luminosity, etc.)
were largely determined by the star's mass and chemical composition, which became known as the Vogt–Russell theorem
(including Heinrich Vogt who independently discovered the result). Since a star's chemical composition 
gradually changes with age (usually in a non-homogeneous fashion), stellar evolution results.

Russell dissuaded Cecilia Payne-Gaposchkin from concluding that the composition of the Sun is different from that of the Earth in her thesis, as it contradicted the accepted wisdom at the time. He realized she was correct four years later after deriving the same result by different means.  In his paper Russell credited Payne with discovering that the Sun had a different chemical composition from Earth.

Awards and honors
 Fellow of the American Academy of Arts and Sciences (1921)
 Gold Medal of the Royal Astronomical Society (1921)
 Lalande Prize (1922)
 Henry Draper Medal from the National Academy of Sciences (1922)
 Bruce Medal (1925)
 Rumford Prize (1925)
 Franklin Medal (1934)
 Janssen Medal from the French Academy of Sciences (1936)
 Foreign Member of the Royal Society (1937)
 Honorary Fellow of the Royal Society of Edinburgh (1938)
 Henry Norris Russell Lectureship (1946)
 asteroid 1762 Russell

References

External links

Oral history interview transcript with Margaret Russell Edmondson on 21 April 1977, American Institute of Physics, Niels Bohr Library & Archives - Margaret Russell Edmondson was Russell's youngest daughter

1877 births
1957 deaths
People from Oyster Bay (town), New York
American astronomers
American astrophysicists
Princeton University alumni
Princeton University faculty
People from Princeton, New Jersey
Burials at Princeton Cemetery
Recipients of the Bruce Medal
Recipients of the Gold Medal of the Royal Astronomical Society
Foreign Members of the Royal Society
Fellows of the American Academy of Arts and Sciences
Members of the United States National Academy of Sciences
Members of the French Academy of Sciences
Scientists from New York (state)